Thomas Fothen (born 6 April 1983 in Neuss) is a German former professional racing cyclist. He is the younger brother of Markus Fothen. He rode in three editions of the Giro d'Italia.

Major results 

2001
 1st  Road race, National Junior Road Championships
 2nd Overall Trofeo Karlsberg
1st Stage 4
2002
 1st  Team pursuit, National Track Championships
2006
 3rd Eindhoven Team Time Trial
 4th Sparkassen Münsterland Giro
 7th Rund um die Nürnberger Altstadt
2008
 10th Rund um die Nürnberger Altstadt
2010
 9th GP de Denain

External links

1983 births
Living people
Sportspeople from Neuss
German male cyclists
Cyclists from North Rhine-Westphalia
21st-century German people